Gangbuk District (Gangbuk-gu) is one of the 25 gu which make up the city of Seoul, South Korea. Its name is derived from it being located at the north of Han river. It was created from neighbouring Dobong District (도봉구) in 1995. The current mayor is Park Gyeom-su(박겸수).

Administrative divisions

Songjung-dong; Legal dong is Mia-dong
Songcheon-dong; Legal dong is Mia-dong
Samgaksan-dong; Legal dong is Mia-dong
Samyang-dong; Legal dong is Mia-dong
Mia-dong; Legal dong is Mia-dong
Beon-dong; Legal dong is Beon-dong
Suyu-dong; Legal dong is Suyu-dong
Insu-dong; Legal dong is Suyu-dong
Ui-dong; Legal dong is Ui-dong

Transportation

Railroad
Seoul Metro
Seoul Subway Line 4
(Dobong-gu) ← Suyu — Mia — Miasamgeori → (Seongbuk-gu)

Notable people

Baek Shin-ji
Gong Ju-yeong

Sister cities

Domestic
 Boseong, South Jeolla
 Dangjin, South Chungcheong
 Gimcheon, North Gyeongsang
 Goseong, Gangwon
 Yangpyeong, Gyeonggi

International
 Jiading District, Shanghai, China
 Tateyama, Toyama, Japan
 Dadong District, Shenyang, Liaoning, China
 Yogyakarta, Indonesia
 Chatham-Kent, Ontario, Canada

References

External links

 Official web site

 
Districts of Seoul